Orphanet is a knowledge base dedicated to rare diseases as well as corresponding diagnosis, orphan drugs, clinical trials and expert networks

The website is managed by a network of academic establishments from 40 countries, led by Inserm. 
It contains content both for physicians and for patients. Its administrative office is in Paris and its official medical journal is the Orphanet Journal of Rare Diseases published on their behalf by BioMed Central.
As of October 2020, the site provides information about over 6100 rare diseases and 5400 genes.

Functions available 
Orphanet is an online database with the aspiration of gathering, providing and improving knowledge on rare diseases and to improve the diagnosis, care and treatment of patients with rare diseases. By listing rare diseases, and maintaining a standard nomenclature of rare diseases (ORPHAcodes) Orphanet makes a contribution in making them more visible in health and research information systems. The information is available in the following languages: English, French, German, Dutch, Spanish, Italian, Portuguese, Polish and Czech.
There is no advertising on the page and there should be no problem to access it from older devices, since there are no animated pop-ups that might slow down the page-view.

Searching for Rare Diseases 
There are various possibilities to search for diseases affecting less than 1 person per 2000 (based on data from Europe). The search is either possible by entering the name of the disease, such as Progeria for instance to receive information about the prevalence and a definition. 
You can also look for a specific disease by entering the ICD-code, the OMIM-code
code or the name of the gene associated with the disease.

Search for Diagnostics and Testing Facilities 
Information on diagnostic tests conducted in order to establish a diagnosis of a rare disease and laboratories which have the technical competence to carry them out can be found in the section "diagnostic tests". Constitutional genetic tests are also registered for non-rare diseases, for diseases with a genetic susceptibility and for pharmacogenetics. Searches can be conducted either by country, speciality,  objective, technique or purpose.

Search for Professionals and Institutions

Professionals 
Professionals working in the field of rare diseases can be found in this section, if they agreed to be listed. It is possible to find consultants and physicians in charge of an expert centre, biologists in laboratories, researchers, representatives of patient organisations, coordinators of networks, principal investigators of clinical trials, managers or contact person of registries and biobanks.

Institutions 
The list of institutions includes for example, institutions hosting expert centres, research or clinical laboratories, patient organisations, institutions hosting registries or biobanks. The information displayed is provided by the professionals working in this institution who and have agreed to be listed.

Directory of Expert Centres 
By entering the respective rare disease you can find information on corresponding centres of expertise or networks of centres of expertise dedicated to the medical management and/or genetic counselling.

The list comprises medical management centres that are officially designated by the health authorities in the country and centres offering genetic counselling and genetic consultations for any genetic disease or for a particular genetic disease/ group of diseases. The results can be sorted either geographically or by specificity and is also possible to specify whether you look for medical management, genetic counselling or both and to state if you need to consult an adult clinic or a child clinic.

Orphan Drug Search 
By entering the requested disease  name you can search the inventory including drugs (and substances) for the treatment of rare diseases at all stages of development. This includes all the substances which have been granted an orphan designation for disease(s) considered as rare in Europe or the USA. Drugs without the designation are also included, as long as they have been granted a marketing authorisation with a specific indication for a rare disease.

Research and Clinical Trials

Research Projects 
Information on ongoing and unpublished research projects explicitly focused on a rare disease – either funded from the regular national research funding or by a funding body with a scientific committee performing a competitive selection of research projects. Single-centre and national or international multicentric research projects are registered.

Clinical Trials  
The clinical trials listed on Orphanet comprise interventional studies aiming to evaluate a drug (substance, or combination) to treat (or prevent) a specific rare disease. The trials can be national or international and, regarding the phase they are in either  recruiting, ongoing or finished. 
The collaboration between the World Health Organization's International Clinical Trials Registry Platform (ICTRP) and Orphanet intends to make clinical trials on rare diseases easily identifiable and findable, thus improving knowledge on rare diseases.

Contact to Patient Organisations 
Information on patient organisations, umbrella organisations and alliances dedicated to one particular rare disease or to a group of rare diseases are provided in this section. They can either be sorted geographically, or by specificity.
Despite the fact that patient organisations should be active, responsive, provide support and information to patients, have a legal status according to the country’s laws and have a designated head and /or a contact person, Orphanet does not assume any responsibility in case they do not fulfill these requirements.

Activity Report and other Publications

On the Orphanet Website  
The Orphanet reports comprises a serie of texts covering topics relevant to all rare diseases. New reports are regularly put online and some of these texts are periodically updated. There is the possibility to download the annual Activity Report as a pdf-file of roughly 80 pages.

Orphanet Journal of Rare Diseases  
The Orphanet Journal of Rare Diseases is published in cooperation with Springer Nature. Numerous reports and features are available online. The offer is free of charge.

See also 
European Organisation for Rare Diseases

References

External links
 
 Orphanet Journal of Rare Diseases
 International Clinical Trials Registry Platform

Biological databases
Medical websites